Coazze (French: Couasse) is a comune (municipality) in the Metropolitan City of Turin in the Italian region Piedmont, located about  west of Turin.

Twin towns
 Decazeville, France

References

Cities and towns in Piedmont